The ringstreaked guitarfish (Rhinobatos hynnicephalus) is a species of fish in the Rhinobatidae family found in China, Japan, South Korea, Taiwan, and Vietnam. Its natural habitats are open seas, shallow seas, coral reefs, and estuarine waters.

Ringstreaked guitarfish have paired reproductive organs, and are ovoviviparous, with a 1:1 sex ratio

References

Rhinobatos
Marine fish of Southeast Asia
Fish described in 1846
Taxonomy articles created by Polbot